The 2016 Seattle Mariners season was the 40th season in franchise history. The Mariners played their 17th full season (18th overall) at Safeco Field. Despite finishing with a winning record of 86–76, they failed to make the playoffs, finishing second place in the American League West Division.

Standings

American League West

American League Wild Card

Record against opponents

Season summary

Game log

|-bgcolor="ffbbbb"
| 1 || April 4 || @ Rangers || 2–3 || Hamels (1–0)  || Hernández (0–1)  || Tolleson (1) || 49,289 || 0–1 ||L1
|-bgcolor="bbffbb"
| 2 || April 5 || @ Rangers || 10–2 || Vincent (1–0) || Barnette (0–1) || — || 28,386 || 1–1 ||W1
|-bgcolor="bbffbb"
| 3 || April 6 || @ Rangers || 9–5 || Benoit (1–0) || Tolleson (0–1) || — || 26,945 || 2–1 ||W2
|-bgcolor="ffbbbb"
| 4 || April 8 || Athletics || 2–3 || Doolittle (1–1) || Cishek (0–1) || Madson (2) || 47,065 || 2–2 ||L1
|-bgcolor="ffbbbb"
| 5 || April 9 || Athletics || 1–6 || Hill (1–1) || Karns (0–1) || — || 36,424 || 2–3 ||L2
|-bgcolor="ffbbbb"
| 6 || April 10 || Athletics || 1–2 (10) || Axford (1–0)  || Vincent (1–1) || Doolittle (1) || 30,834 || 2–4 ||L3
|-bgcolor="ffbbbb"
| 7 || April 11 || Rangers || 3–7 || Lewis (1–0) || Iwakuma (0–1) || — || 13,468 || 2–5 ||L4
|-bgcolor="ffbbbb"
| 8 || April 12 || Rangers || 0–8 || Holland (1–0)  || Miley (0–1)  || — || 13,376 || 2–6 ||L5
|-bgcolor="bbffbb"
| 9 || April 13 || Rangers || 4–2 (10) || Cishek (1–1) || Diekman (0–1) || — || 15,075 || 3–6 ||W1
|-bgcolor="bbffbb"
| 10 || April 15 || @ Yankees || 7–1 || Karns (1–1) || Severino (0–2) || — || 35,531 || 4–6 ||W2
|-bgcolor="bbffbb"
| 11 || April 16 || @ Yankees || 3–2 || Hernández (1–1) || Sabathia (1–1) || Cishek (1) || 38,574 || 5–6 ||W3
|-bgcolor="ffbbbb"
| 12 || April 17 || @ Yankees || 3–4 || Tanaka (1–0) || Iwakuma (0–2) || Miller (3) || 43,856 || 5–7 ||L1
|-bgcolor="ffbbbb"
| 13 || April 19 || @ Indians || 2–3 || Carrasco (2–0) || Miley (0–2) || Allen (4) || 9,393 || 5–8 ||L2
|-bgcolor="bbffbb"
| 14 || April 20 || @ Indians || 2–1 || Walker (1–0) || Salazar (2–1) || Cishek (2) || 9,890 || 6–8 ||W1
|-bgcolor="bbffbb"
| 15 || April 21 || @ Indians || 10–7 (10) || Zych (1–0) || Allen (0–1) || Cishek (3) || 11,525 || 7–8 ||W2
|--bgcolor="bbffbb"
| 16 || April 22 || @ Angels || 5–2 (10) ||Peralta (1–0)  || Álvarez (0–1) || Cishek (4) || 40,755 || 8–8 ||W3
|-bgcolor="ffbbbb"
| 17 || April 23 || @ Angels || 2–4 || Santiago (2–0) || Hernández (1–2) || Street (5) || 41,058 || 8–9 ||L1
|-bgcolor="bbffbb"
| 18 || April 24 || @ Angels || 9–4 || Miley (1–2) || Shoemaker (1–3) || Vincent (1) || 37,754 || 9–9 ||W1
|-bgcolor="bbffbb"
| 19 || April 25 || Astros || 3–2 || Walker (2–0) || Fister (1–3) || Cishek (5) || 14,832 || 10–9 ||W2
|-bgcolor="bbffbb"
| 20 || April 26 || Astros || 11–1 || Karns (2–1) || Keuchel (2–3) || — || 13,821 || 11–9 ||W3
|-bgcolor="ffbbbb"
| 21 || April 27 || Astros || 4–7 || McHugh (2–3) || Iwakuma (0–3) || — || 14,173 || 11–10 ||L1
|-bgcolor="bbffbb"
| 22 || April 29 || Royals || 1–0 || Hernández (2–2) || Medlen (1–2) || Cishek (6) || 38,684 || 12–10 ||W1
|-bgcolor="bbffbb"
| 23 || April 30 || Royals || 6–0 || Miley (2–2)|| Ventura (2–1) || — || 43,444 || 13–10 ||W2
|-

|-bgcolor="ffbbbb"
| 24 || May 1 || Royals || 1–4 || Kennedy (3–2) || Walker (2–1) || Davis (8) || 37,053 || 13–11 ||L1
|-bgcolor="bbffbb"
| 25 || May 2 || @ Athletics || 4–3 || Karns (3–1)  || Graveman (1–3)  || Cishek (7) || 10,535 || 14–11 ||W1
|-bgcolor="bbffbb"
| 26 || May 3 || @ Athletics || 8–2 || Iwakuma (1–3)  || Gray (3–3) || — || 12,584 || 15–11 ||W2
|-bgcolor="bbffbb"
| 27 || May 4 || @ Athletics || 9–8 || Montgomery (1–0) || Axford (2–1) || Cishek (8) || 16,238 || 16–11 ||W3
|-bgcolor="bbffbb"
| 28 || May 5 || @ Astros || 6–3 || Vincent (2–1) || Gregerson (0–1) || Cishek (9) || 20,151 || 17–11 ||W4
|-bgcolor="ffbbbb"
| 29 || May 6 || @ Astros || 3–6 || Fister (3–3) || Walker (2–2) || Gregerson (7) || 25,413 || 17–12 ||L1
|-bgcolor="bbffbb"
| 30 || May 7 || @ Astros || 3–2 (10) || Cishek (2–1) || Sipp (0–2) || — || 31,559 || 18–12 ||W1
|-bgcolor="ffbbbb"
| 31 || May 8 || @ Astros || 1–5 || McHugh (4–3) || Iwakuma (1–4) || — || 28,148 || 18–13 ||L1
|-bgcolor="bbffbb"
| 32 || May 9 || Rays || 5–2 || Hernández (3–2) || Eveland (0–1) || Cishek (10) || 15,230 || 19–13 ||W1
|-bgcolor="bbffbb"
| 33 || May 10 || Rays || 6–4 || Miley (3–2) || Smyly (1–4) || Cishek (11) || 16,013 || 20–13 ||W2
|-bgcolor="bbffbb"
| 34 || May 11 || Rays || 6–5 (11) || Johnson (1–0) || Geltz (0–1) || — || 23,000 || 21–13 ||W3
|-bgcolor="ffbbbb"
| 35 || May 13 || Angels || 6–7 || Smith (1–2) || Cishek (2–2) || Salas (1) || 34,579 || 21–14 ||L1
|-bgcolor="ffbbbb"
| 36 || May 14 || Angels || 7–9 || Bedrosian (1–0) || Cishek (2–3) || Smith (3) || 42,038 || 21–15 ||L2
|-bgcolor="ffbbbb"
| 37 || May 15 || Angels || 0–3 || Santiago (3–2) || Hernández (3–3) || Smith (4) || 40,852 || 21–16 ||L3
|-bgcolor="bbffbb"
| 38 || May 17 || @ Orioles || 10–0 || Miley (4–2) || Jiménez (2–4) || — || 14,477 || 22–16 ||W1
|-bgcolor="ffbbbb"
| 39 || May 18 || @ Orioles || 2–5 || Tillman (6–1) || Walker (2–3) || Britton (11) || 21,167 || 22–17 ||L1
|-bgcolor="bbffbb"
| 40 || May 19 || @ Orioles || 7–2 || Karns (4–1) || Wilson (2–2) || — || 35,012 || 23–17 ||W1
|-bgcolor="bbffbb"
| 41 || May 20 || @ Reds || 8–3 || Iwakuma (2–4) || Wood (3–1) || — || 20,435 || 24–17 ||W2
|-bgcolor="bbffbb"
| 42 || May 21 || @ Reds || 4–0 || Hernández (4–3) || Lamb (0–2) || — || 38,200 || 25–17 ||W3
|-bgcolor="bbffbb"
| 43 || May 22 || @ Reds || 5–4 || Miley (5–2) || Simón (1–5) || Cishek (12) || 24,123 || 26–17 ||W4
|-bgcolor="ffbbbb"
| 44 || May 23 || Athletics || 0–5 || Hill (7–3) || Walker (2–4) || — || 16,370 || 26–18 ||L1
|-bgcolor="bbffbb"
| 45 || May 24 || Athletics || 6–5 || Montgomery (2–0) || Madson (2–1) || — || 17,471 || 27–18 ||W1
|-bgcolor="bbffbb"
| 46 || May 25 || Athletics || 13–3 || Iwakuma (3–4) || Neal (0–1)  || — || 19,227 || 28–18 ||W2
|-bgcolor="ffbbbb"
| 47 || May 27 || Twins || 2–7 || Dean (1–1)  || Hernández (4–4) || — || 40,921 || 28–19 ||L1
|-bgcolor="ffbbbb"
| 48 || May 28 || Twins || 5–6 || Pressly (2–3)  || Vincent (2–2)  || Jepsen (5) || 28,309 || 28–20 ||L2
|-bgcolor="ffbbbb"
| 49 || May 29 || Twins || 4–5 || Nolasco (2–3)  || Walker (2–5)  || Jepsen (6) || 33,748 || 28–21 ||L3
|-bgcolor="bbffbb"
| 50 || May 30 || Padres || 9–3 || Karns (5–1) || Cashner (2–5) || — || 29,764 || 29–21 ||W1
|-bgcolor="bbffbb"
| 51 || May 31 || Padres || 16–4 || Iwakuma (4–4) || Shields (2–7) || — || 16,815 || 30–21 ||W2
|-

|-bgcolor="ffbbbb"
| 52 || June 1 || @ Padres || 6–14 || Friedrich (2–1) || Paxton (0–1) || — || 20,557 || 30–22 ||L1
|-bgcolor="bbffbb"
| 53 || June 2 || @ Padres || 16–13 || Martin (1–0) || Maurer (0–2) || Cishek (13) || 22,588 || 31–22 ||W1
|-bgcolor="ffbbbb"
| 54 || June 3 || @ Rangers || 3–7 || Darvish (2–0) || Walker (2–6) || — || 32,395 || 31–23 ||L1
|-bgcolor="ffbbbb"
| 55 || June 4 || @ Rangers || 4–10 || Pérez (4–4) || Karns (5–2) || — || 34,317 || 31–24 ||L2
|-bgcolor="ffbbbb"
| 56 || June 5 || @ Rangers || 2–3 || Holland (5–4) || Iwakuma (4–5) || Dyson (7) || 37,616 || 31–25 ||L3
|-bgcolor="ffbbbb"
| 57 || June 6 || Indians || 1–3 || Bauer (4–2) || Paxton (0–2) || Allen (12) || 15,824 || 31–26 ||L4
|-bgcolor="bbffbb"
| 58 || June 7 || Indians || 7–1 || Miley (6–2) || Anderson (1–4) || — || 16,944 || 32–26 ||W1
|-bgcolor="bbffbb"
| 59 || June 8 || Indians || 5–0 || Walker (3–6) || Carrasco (2–1) || — || 15,337 || 33–26 ||W2
|-bgcolor="ffbbbb"
| 60 || June 9 || Indians || 3–5 || Otero (1–0) || Benoit (1–1) || Allen (13) || 19,901 || 33–27 ||L1
|-bgcolor="bbffbb"
| 61 || June 10 || Rangers || 7–5 || Iwakuma (5–5) || Holland (5–5) || Cishek (14) || 37,055 || 34–27 ||W1
|-bgcolor="ffbbbb"
| 62 || June 11 || Rangers || 1–2 (11) || Bush (2–0) || Montgomery (2–1) || Dyson (9) || 36,055 || 34–28 ||L1
|-bgcolor="ffbbbb"
| 63 || June 12 || Rangers || 4–6 || Hamels (6–1) || Miley (6–3) || Dyson (10) || 39,251 || 34–29 ||L2
|-bgcolor="ffbbbb"
| 64 || June 14 || @ Rays || 7–8 || Garton (1–0) || Montgomery (2–2) || Colomé (19) || 11,455 || 34–30 ||L3
|-bgcolor="ffbbbb"
| 65 || June 15 || @ Rays || 2–3 (13) || Andriese (6–0) || Montgomery (2–3) || — || 12,239 || 34–31 ||L4
|-bgcolor="bbffbb"
| 66 || June 16 || @ Rays || 6–4 || Paxton (1–2) || Snell (0–1) || Cishek (15) || 11,331 || 35–31 ||W1
|-bgcolor="bbffbb"
| 67 || June 17 || @ Red Sox || 8–4 || Iwakuma (6–5) || Elias (0–1) || Cishek (16) || 35,896 || 36–31 ||W2
|-bgcolor="ffbbbb"
| 68 || June 18 || @ Red Sox || 2–6 || Porcello (8–2) || Sampson (0–1) || — || 37,195 || 36–32 ||L1
|-bgcolor="ffbbbb"
| 69 || June 19 || @ Red Sox || 1–2 || Price (8–4) || Díaz (0–1) || Kimbrel (16) || 37,211 || 36–33 ||L2
|-bgcolor="ffbbbb"
| 70 || June 20 || @ Tigers || 7–8 (12) || Sánchez (4–7) || Nuño (0–1) || — || 27,670 || 36–34 ||L3
|-bgcolor="ffbbbb"
| 71 || June 21 || @ Tigers || 2–4 || Rondón (1–0) || Paxton (1–3) || Rodríguez (20) || 30,150 || 36–35 ||L4
|-bgcolor="ffbbbb"
| 72 || June 22 || @ Tigers || 1–5 || Ryan (2–2) || Iwakuma (6–6) || – || 31,497 || 36–36 ||L5
|-bgcolor="ffbbbb"
| 73 || June 23 || @ Tigers || 4–5 (10) || Ryan (3–2) || Cishek (2–4) || — || 35,767 || 36–37 ||L6
|-bgcolor="bbffbb"
| 74 || June 24 || Cardinals || 4–3 || Roach (1–0) || Rosenthal (2–3) || — || 35,746 || 37–37 ||W1
|-bgcolor="bbffbb"
| 75 || June 25 || Cardinals || 5–4 || Karns (6–2) || Leake (5–5) || Cishek (17) || 40,431 || 38–37 ||W2
|-bgcolor="ffbbbb"
| 76 || June 26 || Cardinals || 6–11 || Siegrist (5–2) || Vincent (2–3) || — || 35,955 || 38–38 ||L1
|-bgcolor="bbffbb"
| 77 || June 28 || Pirates || 5–2 || Iwakuma (7–6) || Niese (6–6) || Cishek (18) || 24,836 || 39–38 ||W1
|-bgcolor="ffbbbb"
| 78 || June 29 || Pirates || 1–8 || Taillon (2–1) || Miley (6–4) || — || 25,477 || 39–39 ||L1
|-bgcolor="bbffbb"
| 79 || June 30 || Orioles || 5–3 || Walker (4–6) || Tillman (10–2) || Cishek (19) || 23,715 || 40–39 ||W1
|-

|-bgcolor="bbffbb"
| 80 || July 1 || Orioles || 5–2 || LeBlanc (1–0) || Gausman (1–6) || Cishek (20) || 33,006 || 41–39 ||W2
|-bgcolor="bbffbb"
| 81 || July 2 || Orioles || 12–6 || Paxton (2–3) || Wilson (4–6) || Karns (1) || 29,362 || 42–39 ||W3
|-bgcolor="bbffbb"
| 82 || July 3 || Orioles || 9–4 || Iwakuma (8–6) || Jiménez (5–8) || — || 31,405 || 43–39 ||W4
|-bgcolor="ffbbbb"
| 83 || July 4 || @ Astros || 1–2 || McCullers (4–2) || Miley (6–5) || Harris (8) || 29,844 || 43–40 ||L1
|-bgcolor="ffbbbb"
| 84 || July 5 || @ Astros || 2–5 || Keuchel (6–9) || Walker (4–7) || Harris (9) || 21,553 || 43–41 ||L2
|-bgcolor="ffbbbb"
| 85 || July 6 || @ Astros || 8–9 || Giles (1–3) || Díaz (0–2) || Gregerson (14) || 25,709 || 43–42 ||L3
|-bgcolor="ffbbbb"
| 86 || July 7 || @ Royals || 3–4 || Pounders (1–0) || Cishek (2–5) || — || 31,425 || 43–43 ||L4
|-bgcolor="bbffbb"
| 87 || July 8 || @ Royals || 3–2 || Iwakuma (9–6) || Ventura (6–7) || Cishek (21) || 33,391 || 44–43 ||W1
|-bgcolor="ffbbbb"
| 88 || July 9 || @ Royals || 3–5 || Vólquez (8–8) || Miley (6–6) || Herrera (1) || 30,659 || 44–44 ||L1
|-bgcolor="bbffbb"
| 89 || July 10 || @ Royals || 8–5 || Montgomery (3–3) || Gee (3–3) || — || 27,544 || 45–44 ||W1
|- style="text-align:center; background:#bbcaff;"
| colspan="10" | 87th All-Star Game in San Diego, California
|-bgcolor="ffbbbb"
| 90 || July 15 || Astros || 3–7 || Fister (9–6) || Paxton (2–4) || — || 29,217 || 45–45 ||L1
|-bgcolor="bbffbb"
| 91 || July 16 || Astros || 1–0 || Iwakuma (10–6) || McCullers (4–4) || Cishek (22) || 41,386 || 46–45 ||W1
|-bgcolor="ffbbbb"
| 92 || July 17 || Astros || 1–8 || McHugh (6–6) || Montgomery (3–4) || — || 27,322 || 46–46 ||L1
|-bgcolor="bbffbb"
| 93 || July 18 || White Sox || 4–3 || Rollins (1–0) || Robertson (0–2) || — || 20,598 || 47–46 ||W1
|-bgcolor="ffbbbb"
| 94 || July 19 || White Sox || 1–6 || Quintana (8–8) || Miley (6–7) || — || 24,851 || 47–47 ||L1
|-bgcolor="bbffbb"
| 95 || July 20 || White Sox || 6–5 (11) || Nuño (1–1) || Jennings (3–2) || — || 39,985 || 48–47 ||W1 
|-bgcolor="bbffbb"
| 96 || July 22 || @ Blue Jays || 2–1 || Paxton (3–4) || Estrada (5–4) || Cishek (23) || 46,737 || 49–47 ||W2
|-bgcolor="bbffbb"
| 97 || July 23 || @ Blue Jays || 14–5 || Iwakuma (11–6) || Dickey (7–11) || LeBlanc (1) || 47,517 || 50–47 ||W3
|-bgcolor="ffbbbb"
| 98 || July 24 || @ Blue Jays || 0–2 || Happ (13–3) || Miley (6–8) || Osuna (20) || 47,488 || 50–48 ||L1
|-bgcolor="bbffbb"
| 99 || July 26 || @ Pirates || 7–4 || Hernández (5–4) || Liriano (6–10) || Cishek (24) || 30,969 || 51–48 ||W1
|-bgcolor="ffbbbb"
| 100 || July 27 || @ Pirates || 1–10 || Cole (6–6) || Paxton (3–5) || — || 35,483 || 51–49 ||L1
|-bgcolor="ffbbbb"
| 101 || July 29 || @ Cubs || 1–12 || Lester (11–4) || Iwakuma (11–7) || — || 40,951 || 51–50 ||L2
|-bgcolor="bbffbb"
| 102 || July 30 || @ Cubs || 4–1 || Miley (7–8) || Arrieta (12–5) || Cishek (25) || 41,401 || 52–50 ||W1
|-bgcolor="ffbbbb"
| 103 || July 31 || @ Cubs || 6–7 (12) || Rondon (2–2) || Martin (1–1) || — || 40,952 || 52–51 ||L1
|-

|-bgcolor="ffbbbb"
| 104 || August 1 || Red Sox || 1–2 || Tazawa (2–1) || Cishek (2–6) || Kimbrel (18) || 29,601 || 52–52 ||L2
|-bgcolor="bbffbb"
| 105 || August 2 || Red Sox || 5–4 || Roach (2–0) || Abad (1–5) || Díaz (1) || 25,240 || 53–52 ||W1
|-bgcolor="bbffbb"
| 106 || August 3 || Red Sox || 3–1 || Iwakuma (12–7) || Porcello (14–3) || Díaz (2) || 24,494 || 54–52 ||W2
|-bgcolor="ffbbbb"
| 107 || August 4 || Red Sox || 2–3 (11) || Kimbrel (2–3) || Martin (1–2) || Ziegler (21) || 33,369 || 54–53 ||L1
|-bgcolor="bbffbb"
| 108 || August 5 || Angels || 6–4 || Hernández (6–4) || Lincecum (2–6) || Díaz (3) || 40,354 || 55–53 ||W1
|-bgcolor="bbffbb"
| 109 || August 6 || Angels || 8–6 || Storen (2–3) || Valdez (0–1) || Díaz (4) || 45,618 || 56–53 ||W2
|-bgcolor="bbffbb"
| 110 || August 7 || Angels || 3–1 || Paxton (4–5) || Shoemaker (6–12) || Wilhelmsen (1) || 44,812 || 57–53 ||W3
|-bgcolor="bbffbb"
| 111 || August 8 || Tigers || 3–0 || Iwakuma (13–7) || Fulmer (9–3) || Díaz (5) || 20,002 || 58–53 ||W4
|-bgcolor="bbffbb"
| 112 || August 9 || Tigers || 6–5 (15) || Miranda (1–0) || Rodríguez (1–3) || — || 19,713 || 59–53 ||W5
|-bgcolor="bbffbb"
| 113 || August 10 || Tigers || 3–1 || Caminero (2–2) || Wilson (2–4) || Vincent (2) || 28,742 || 60–53 ||W6
|-bgcolor="ffbbbb"
| 114 || August 12 || @ Athletics || 3–6 || Manaea (4–7) || Wieland (0–1) || Madson (25) || 14,073 || 60–54 ||L1
|-bgcolor="bbffbb"
| 115 || August 13 || @ Athletics || 4–3 || Iwakuma (14–7) || Graveman (8–8) || Díaz (6) || 35,067 || 61–54 ||W1
|-bgcolor="bbffbb"
| 116 || August 14 || @ Athletics || 8–4 || LeBlanc (2–0) || Neal (2–2) || — || 21,203 || 62–54 ||W2
|-bgcolor="bbffbb"
| 117 || August 15 || @ Angels || 3–2 || Hernández (7–4) || Nolasco (4–10) || Díaz (7) || 35,840 || 63–54 ||W3
|-bgcolor="ffbbbb"
| 118 || August 16 || @ Angels || 6–7 || Oberholtzer (3–2) || Caminero (2–3) || Salas (3) || 37,546 || 63–55 ||L1
|-bgcolor="bbffbb"
| 119 || August 17 || @ Angels || 4–3 || Storen (3–3) || Skaggs (1–2) || Díaz (8) || 36,950 || 64–55 ||W1
|-bgcolor="ffbbbb"
| 120 || August 18 || @ Angels || 4–6 || Shoemaker (7–13) || Iwakuma (14–8) || — || 37,721 || 64–56 ||L1
|-bgcolor="bbffbb"
| 121 || August 19 || Brewers || 7–6 || LeBlanc (3–0) || Suter (0–1) || Díaz (9) || 37,758 || 65–56 ||W1
|-bgcolor="bbffbb"
| 122 || August 20 || Brewers || 8–2 || Hernández (8–4) || Peralta (5–9) || — || 29,170 || 66–56 ||W2
|-bgcolor="ffbbbb"
| 123 || August 21 || Brewers || 6–7 || Thornburg (5–4) || Wilhelmsen (2–4) || – || 35,833 || 66–57 ||L1
|-bgcolor="bbffbb"
| 124 || August 22 || Yankees || 7–5 || Vincent (3–3) || Swarzak (1–2) || Díaz (10) || 24,384 || 67–57 ||W1
|-bgcolor="ffbbbb"
| 125 || August 23 || Yankees || 1–5 || Sabathia (8–10) || Walker (4–8) || — || 24,628 || 67–58 ||L1
|-bgcolor="ffbbbb"
| 126 || August 24 || Yankees || 0–5 || Tanaka (11–4) || Iwakuma (14–9) || — || 41,536 || 67–59 ||L2
|-bgcolor="ffbbbb"
| 127 || August 25 || @ White Sox || 6–7 || Robertson (4–2) || Vincent (3–4) || — || 19,072 || 67–60 ||L3
|-bgcolor="bbffbb"
| 128 || August 26 || @ White Sox || 3–1 || Hernández (9–4) || Sale (15–7) || Díaz (11) || 25,651 || 68–60 ||W1
|-bgcolor="ffbbbb"
| 129 || August 27 || @ White Sox || 3–9 || Quintana (11–9) || Miranda (1–1) || — || 27,318 || 68–61 ||L1
|-bgcolor="ffbbbb"
| 130 || August 28 || @ White Sox || 1–4 || Rodon (5–8) || Walker (4–9) || Robertson (33) || 25,538 || 68–62 ||L2
|-bgcolor="ffbbbb"
| 131 || August 29 || @ Rangers || 3–6 || Darvish (5–3) || Iwakuma (14–10) || Dyson (30) || 22,972 || 68–63 ||L3
|-bgcolor="ffbbbb"
| 132 || August 30 || @ Rangers || 7–8 || Bush (6–2) || Díaz (0–3) || — || 26,950 || 68–64 ||L4
|-bgcolor="ffbbbb"
| 133 || August 31 || @ Rangers || 1–14 || Pérez (9–10) || Hernández (9–5) || — || 21,309 || 68–65 ||L5
|-

|-bgcolor="bbffbb"
| 134 || September 2 || Angels || 11–8 || Miranda (2–1) || Oberholtzer (3–3) || Díaz (12) || 16,775 || 69–65 ||W1
|-bgcolor="ffbbbb"
| 135 || September 3 || Angels || 3–10 || Skaggs (3–3) || Walker (4–10) || — || 20,357 || 69–66 ||L1
|-bgcolor="ffbbbb"
| 136 || September 4 || Angels || 2–4 || Guerra (3–0) || Iwakuma (14–11) || Bailey (1) || 24,033 || 69–67 ||L2
|-bgcolor="bbffbb"
| 137 || September 5 || Rangers || 14–6 || Hernández (10–5) || Hamels (14–5) || — || 23,618 || 70–67 ||W1
|-bgcolor="ffbbbb"
| 138 || September 6 || Rangers || 7–10 || Pérez (10–10) || Paxton (4–6) || Dyson (32) || 14,615 || 70–68 ||L1
|-bgcolor="bbffbb"
| 139 || September 7 || Rangers || 8–3 || Miranda (3–1) || Griffin (7–4) || — || 15,434 || 71–68 ||W1
|-bgcolor="bbffbb"
| 140 || September 8 || Rangers || 6–3 || Walker (5–10) || Holland (7–7) || Díaz (13) || 17,493 || 72–68 ||W2
|-bgcolor="bbffbb"
| 141 || September 9 || @ Athletics || 3–2 || Iwakuma (15–11) || Mengden (1–7) || Díaz (14) || 19,385 || 73–68 ||W3
|-bgcolor="bbffbb"
| 142 || September 10 || @ Athletics || 14–3 || Hernández (11–5) || Graveman (10–10) || — || 18,438 || 74–68 ||W4
|-bgcolor="bbffbb"
| 143 || September 11 || @ Athletics || 3–2 || Cishek (3–6) || Madson (5–5) || Díaz (15) || 13,610 || 75–68 ||W5
|-bgcolor="bbffbb"
| 144 || September 12 || @ Angels || 8–1 || Miranda (4–1) || Nolasco (5–14) || — || 29,932 || 76–68 ||W6
|-bgcolor="bbffbb"
| 145 || September 13 || @ Angels || 8–0 || Walker (6–10) || Meyer (0–3) || — || 32,139 || 77–68 ||W7
|-bgcolor="bbffbb"
| 146 || September 14 || @ Angels || 2–1 || Iwakuma (16–11) || Valdez (1–3) || Díaz (16) || 33,501 || 78–68 ||W8
|-bgcolor="ffbbbb"
| 147 || September 16 || Astros || 0–6 || McHugh (11–10) || Hernández (11–6) || — || 30,178 || 78–69 ||L1
|-bgcolor="ffbbbb"
| 148 || September 17 || Astros || 1–2 || Fiers (11–7) || Paxton (4–7) || Giles (11) || 32,304 || 78–70 ||L2
|-bgcolor="bbffbb"
| 149 || September 18 || Astros || 7–3 || Miranda (5–1) || Fister (12–12) || — || 25,383 || 79–70 ||W1
|-bgcolor="ffbbbb"
| 150 || September 19 || Blue Jays || 2–3 || Estrada (9–9) || Walker (6–11) || Osuna (34) || 34,809 || 79–71 ||L1
|-bgcolor="ffbbbb"
| 151 || September 20 || Blue Jays || 2–10 || Happ (20–4) || Iwakuma (16–12) || — || 33,573 || 79–72 ||L2
|-bgcolor="bbffbb"
| 152 || September 21 || Blue Jays || 2–1 (12) || Vincent (4–4) || Dickey (10–15) || — || 39,595 || 80–72 ||W1
|-bgcolor="bbffbb"
| 153 || September 23 || @ Twins || 10–1 || Paxton (5–7) || Gibson (6–11) || — || 22,683 || 81–72 ||W2
|-bgcolor="ffbbbb"
| 154 || September 24 || @ Twins || 2–3 || Duffey (9–11) || Miranda (5–2) || Kintzler (15) || 24,749 || 81–73 ||L1
|-bgcolor="bbffbb"
| 155 || September 25 || @ Twins || 4–3 || Walker (7–11) || Santiago (12–10) || Díaz (17) || 22,092 || 82–73 ||W1
|-bgcolor="bbffbb"
| 156 || September 26 || @ Astros || 4–3 (11) || Storen (4–3) || Gregerson (4–3) || Vincent (3) || 24,107 || 83–73 ||W2
|-bgcolor="ffbbbb"
| 157 || September 27 || @ Astros || 4–8 || Gustave (1–0) || Hernandez (11–7) || — || 23,499 || 83–74 || L1
|-bgcolor="bbffbb"
| 158 || September 28 || @ Astros || 12–4 || Paxton (6–7) || Fister (12–13) || — || 21,187 || 84–74 || W1
|-bgcolor="bbffbb"
| 159 || September 29 || Athletics || 3–2 || Cishek (4–6) || Hendriks (0–4) || Díaz (18) || 19,796 || 85–74 ||W2
|-bgcolor="bbffbb"
| 160 || September 30 || Athletics || 5–1 || Walker (8–11) || Alcántara (1–3) || — || 24,088 || 86–74 ||W3
|-

|-bgcolor="ffbbbb"
| 161 || October 1 || Athletics || 8–9 (10) || Madson (6–7) || Díaz (0–4) || — || 29,522 || 86–75 ||L1
|-bgcolor="ffbbbb"
| 162 || October 2 || Athletics || 2–3 || Manaea (7–9) || Hernández (11–8) || Axford (3) || 24,856 || 86–76 ||L2
|-

|-
| Legend:       = Win       = Loss       = PostponementBold = Mariners team member

Roster

Statistics

Batting

Players in bold are on the active roster.

Note: G = Games played; AB = At bats; R = Runs; H = Hits; 2B = Doubles; 3B = Triples; HR = Home runs; RBI = Runs batted in; Avg. = Batting average; OBP = On-base percentage; SLG = Slugging percentage; SB = Stolen bases

Pitching

Players in bold are on the active roster.

Note: W = Wins; L = Losses; ERA = Earned run average; G = Games pitched; GS = Games started; SV = Saves; IP = Innings pitched; H = Hits allowed; R = Runs allowed; ER = Earned runs allowed; BB = Walks allowed; K = Strikeouts

Farm system

LEAGUE CHAMPIONS: Jackson, AZL Mariners

References

External links

2016 Seattle Mariners season Official Site 
2016 Seattle Mariners season at ESPN
2016 Seattle Mariners season at Baseball Reference

Seattle Mariners seasons
Seattle Mariners season
Seattle Mariners
Mariners